William Egerton Perdue (20 June 1850 – 17 January 1933) was a Canadian lawyer and judge. He was Chief Justice of Manitoba from 1918 to 1929.

References

External links 

 Memorable Manitobans: William Egerton Perdue (1850-1933)

People from Brampton
1933 deaths
University of Toronto alumni
Lawyers in Ontario
Lawyers in Manitoba
Judges in Manitoba